Saudi Arabia participated in the 1982 Asian Games in Delhi, India from November 19 to December 4, 1982. Saudi Arabia ended the games with a single bronze medal.

References

Nations at the 1982 Asian Games
1982
Asian Games